Roberto Zárate (15 December 1932 – 6 November 2013) was an Argentine footballer. He played in 15 matches for the Argentina national football team from 1956 to 1963. He was also named in Argentina's squad for the qualification tournament for the 1958 FIFA World Cup.

References

External links
 

1932 births
2013 deaths
Argentine footballers
Argentina international footballers
Place of birth missing
Association football forwards
Club Atlético River Plate footballers
Club Atlético Banfield footballers